Jorge Sánchez (born October 3, 1991) is an American wheelchair basketball player and a member of the United States men's national wheelchair basketball team. He represented the United States at the 2020 Summer Paralympics.

Career
Sánchez represented the United States in wheelchair basketball at the 2020 Summer Paralympics and won a gold medal.

References

1991 births
Living people
American men's wheelchair basketball players
Medalists at the 2019 Parapan American Games
Paralympic wheelchair basketball players of the United States
Wheelchair basketball players at the 2020 Summer Paralympics
Medalists at the 2020 Summer Paralympics
Paralympic medalists in wheelchair basketball
Paralympic gold medalists for the United States
Basketball players from Oakland, California
21st-century American people